HD 172910 is a class B2.5V (blue main-sequence) star in the constellation Sagittarius. Its apparent magnitude is 4.87 and it is approximately 467 light years away based on parallax.

It has one companion, B, with magnitude 12.6 and separation 10.0".

In Chinese astronomy, HD 172910 is called 農丈人 (Pinyin: Nóngzhàngrén), because this star is marking itself and stand alone in Peasant asterism, Dipper mansion (see : Chinese constellation).

References

Sagittarius (constellation)
B-type main-sequence stars
Double stars
CD-35 12876
091918
7029
172910